Beyramabad or Bayramabad may refer to:
 Beyramabad, North Khorasan
 Beyramabad, Firuzeh, in Razavi Khorasan Province
 Beyramabad, Mashhad, in Razavi Khorasan Province

See also
 Bahramabad (disambiguation)